Royal Air Force Moreton Valence or more simply RAF Moreton Valence is a former Royal Air Force installation located  southwest of Gloucester, Gloucestershire and  northwest of Cirencester, Gloucestershire, England.

History
RAF Moreton Valence opened in 1939 and was closed in 1962. The airfield was situated between the A38 and B4008 roads east of the village of Moreton Valence, and was also known as Haresfield airfield. During World War Two, it had three concrete runways and associated aircraft hangars including A1, blister, B1 and B2 types. It was a satellite of RAF Staverton and was used by an Advanced Flying Unit of Royal Air Force Flying Training Command. During World War Two, it also hosted secret tests of the Armstrong Whitworth Albemarle bomber. 

Beginning in October 1943, it was also used by Gloster aircraft for testing Meteor jet aircraft. Moreton Valence's runway had been extended to 6,000 feet to allow testing of the Meteor. Peter Cadbury flew as a test pilot for Glosters during World War II, and fondly remembered his first flight in a jet, at Moreton Valence. There were no two-seat versions, so his first solo in a Meteor would also be his first flight in one: 

"When [check pilot] Michael Daunt was satisfied that I knew enough about the Meteor to be trusted to fly it, I was put in the cockpit . . .'Line up, set the rpm at 14,000, watch the jet pipe temperature and good luck,' he said, slapped the side of the aeroplane and walked away. I did as I was told and released the brakes . . . It was a thrill I shall never forget, as the aircraft accelerated down the runway . . . My immediate reaction was the lack of noise or vibration . . . The Meteor project was Top Secret and we were told not to fly out of the Moreton Valence area and avoid having to force-land anywhere else."

In the post-war period, it was used by Glosters for further testing of the Meteor, and was also used for final completion of Javelin fighters which were built in Brockworth and flown the short distance to Moreton Valence, the runway at Brockworth being too short to safely allow a completed Javelin to take off. The airfield site has been subsequently bisected by the M5 and some areas are used for industrial parks. 

The following units were posted here:
 No. 3 (Pilots) Advanced Flying Unit RAF
 No. 6 Air Observers Navigation School RAF
 No. 6 Air Observers School RAF
 No. 6 (Observers) Advanced Flying Unit RAF
 No. 6 (Pilots) Advanced Flying Unit RAF
 No. 12 (RNZAF) Personnel Reception Centre
 No. 83 Gliding School RAF
 Pilot Refresher Training Unit

References

Royal Air Force stations in Gloucestershire